Your Movement (which can also be translated as Your Move, TR) is a social liberal, populist and anti-clerical political party in Poland. The party was founded by Janusz Palikot, a former Civic Platform MP, in October 2010 as Palikot's Movement (RP). The party is classified as a centre-left to left-wing party in the context of Polish politics.

The party adopted its current name and programme on 6 October 2013.

History

In July 2010, Palikot—then still a member of Civic Platform (PO)—suggested that the late President Lech Kaczyński was himself to blame for the Polish Air Force Tu-154 crash in Smolensk, Russia. In the aftermath of the resulting controversy, Palikot announced plans to create his own social movement. On 2 October he organized the "Modern Poland" congress in Warsaw, attended by several thousand. At the congress, Palikot announced his 15-point program.
On 6 October, Palikot resigned from PO, along with Kazimierz Kutz.

On 9 January 2011, Palikot gave his MP ID card to the Great Orchestra of Christmas Charity to be auctioned off.

On 1 June 2011, Palikot formally registered his movement as a political party called Palikot Movement (RP).

In the October 2011 parliamentary election, the party received 10 percent of the vote and won 40 seats in the Sejm, making it the third party in the chamber behind Civic Platform and Law and Justice (PiS), one of the best debut performances for a party since the end of communism. After the election, one of the MPs of Democratic Left Alliance (SLD), Sławomir Kopyciński, decided to leave his party and join Palikot Movement.

Anna Grodzka, the first ever transsexual MP in European history, was elected from the party lists in 2011. Also, Robert Biedroń became the first openly gay MP in Polish political history. One parliamentarian, Roman Kotliński, is a former priest of the Catholic Church.

On 8 March 2012, Łukasz Gibała, head of the Krakow structures of the governing PO, joined Palikot Movement, becoming the 43rd MP of the party. His transfer was somewhat significant in that he is the nephew of the Minister of Justice Jarosław Gowin.

On 3 February 2013, Palikot Movement and Racja PL started collaboration with Social Democracy of Poland, Labour United and Union of the Left to form an electoral alliance named Europa Plus to contest the upcoming European Parliament elections. The project was led by Marek Siwiec, Aleksander Kwasniewski and Janusz Palikot.

On 6 May 2013, Palikot Movement registered its first local party committee abroad, which had been formed by Poles residing in Brussels, Belgium.

On 25 May 2014, in the 2014 European election, Europa Plus received 3.6% of the vote, below the 5% electoral threshold, thus failed to elect any MEPs. On 29 May 2014, Europa Plus was disbanded.

On 6 October 2013, the party was renamed and refounded as Your Movement (TR).

In July 2015 TR and the SLD, Labour United (UP) and The Greens (PZ) formed the United Left (ZL) electoral alliance to contest the upcoming parliamentary election.

In the 2015 parliamentary election 25 October 2015, the United Left list was led by Your Movement's Barbara Nowacka and received only 7.6% of the vote, below the 8% threshold, leaving TR without parliamentary representation.

In the 2019 Polish parliamentary election the party stood under the banner of The Left.

Ideology
Sources described Palikot Movement as liberal, anti-clerical, and pro-European. Media variously described Palikot Movement as libertarian, liberal, anti-clerical, populist and left-wing. The British Financial Times newspaper described the economic views of the Palikot Movement membership as heterogenous, ranging from libertarianism to social democracy.

Palikot Movement wanted to end religious education in state schools, end state subsidies of churches, legalize abortion on demand, lower the voting age to 16, give out free condoms, allow same-sex marriages, switch to the mixed-member proportional representation system, reform the Social Security Agency, abolish the Senate, legalize cannabis and implement flat taxes.

Your Movement has been described as social-liberal, anti-clerical and pro-European. The party places an emphasis upon supporting LGBT rights.

Election Results

Sejm

European Parliament

See also
 Civil libertarianism
 Drug liberalization
 LGBT rights
 LGBT rights in Poland
 Polish Initiative
 Secular humanism
 Secular liberalism

References

External links
 Your Movement official website
 Your Movement caucus in the Sejm

2010 establishments in Poland
Anti-clerical parties
Centre-left parties in Europe
Left-libertarianism
Left-wing parties in Europe
Left-wing populism
LGBT political advocacy groups in Poland
Liberal parties in Poland
Political parties established in 2010
Political parties in Poland
Populist parties
Progressive parties
Secularism in Poland
Secularist organizations
Social liberal parties
Pro-European political parties in Poland